Aznaur Albertovich Geryugov (born 12 August 1992) is a Kyrgyzstan-born Russian football player. He plays for FC Volga Ulyanovsk.

Club career
He made his debut in the Russian Football National League for FC Akron Tolyatti on 1 August 2020 in a game against FC Fakel Voronezh, as a starter.

References

External links
 
 Profile by Russian Football National League
 

1992 births
People from Chüy Region
Kyrgyzstani emigrants to Russia
Living people
Russian footballers
Kyrgyzstani footballers
Association football midfielders
FC Abdysh-Ata Kant players
FC Lada-Tolyatti players
FC Akron Tolyatti players
FC Volga Ulyanovsk players
Kyrgyz Premier League players
Russian First League players
Russian Second League players